, also known as Doraemon The Super Star 2015 and later as Doraemon the Movie 35th is a anime science fiction action adventure film and the 35th Doraemon film. Released in Japan on 7 March 2015, it commemorates the 35th anniversary of the Doraemon (1979) anime series and the 10th anniversary of the Doraemon (2005) anime. It is similar to Doraemon's 6th movie, Nobita's Little Star Wars (1985).

Plot 
One night, a space ship crashes into the hill at dark night. The next morning, Suneo, Gian and Shizuka decide to make a movie about a space-based hero film "Guardians of the Galaxy", which is a magical current blockbuster. 

Meanwhile, Nobita does rubber band art in front of the little kids, and heads towards the hill where he finds his three friends shooting the film. Gian and Suneo made Nobita perform as the monster, as Nobita wanted to act. Gian beats Nobita as he was a space alien, where Nobita runs away to his house to ask help from Doreamon. After that, the two return to the hill and Doraemon takes a gadget from his pocket, which is a film director called Burger director. They all become space heroes (using a "real-light", which made their costumes real) and with the help from Burger, they started fighting a fake space monster. 

Later, an alien from another planet arrive to ask help from the space heroes and they agreed to follow him. On the spacecraft, the alien named Aron reveals himself as the sheriff of Pokkoru planet which is full of mice. He was lucky to escape the pursuit of security personnel of "Recreation Land Space" (who are actually alien pirates). The following morning, Aron and the reconnaissance group enter the Pokkoru planet. After that Aron tries to warn the councilors and public to remain alert, but no one believes him. Nobita discovers some alien pirates so they push him away, where he goes down and drops the star crest down in the wells. 

Fortunately, Aron finds Nobita tied by ropes and accidentally left his disguise active knowing that Space Land is sucking the energy plan of the planet to shoot down the Arumasu star. However, Aron and Nobita were discovered by Meba, and Gian and Suneo were arrested earlier by Ogon. Shizuka, Doraemon and Nobita had seen the star drifting toward him, and they knew something was wrong so they rescue them and their friends. Although the rescue was successful, Shizuka was caught by Haido. In order to make Aron's group surrender, he threatens to impale her, but Burger director shows virtual images to scare Haido and save Shizuka. 

When all of them shelter, the group began to split and Aron learns the truth about the heroes, but still he praises the group as heroes since they still came to the Pokkoru planet for helping him. The group decides to help save the planet, where they move straight to the tower group Space, while the residents of Pokkoru were unaware of their dangers. Meba and Ogon arrive to block and fight the group, while Haido and his group is in the basement below the tower. Meba attacks Aron and Nobita tries to help, but was accidentally teleported inside the pirates's ship due to the belt on Meba’s waist fell against him, Shizuka then fights and defeats Meba, while Gian also defeats Ogon. 

Meanwhile, Doraemon, Suneo, and Aron heads towards the basement, but Haido used his fighter to chase them away. Shizuka and Gian arrive and crashes Haido's fighter, resulting in Haido getting knocked in the crash. After confronting Haido, the group learns the pirates secret to steal diamonds from the Arumasu Star. Nobita fights with Ikaros alone, where he discovers that Ikaros is too weak (due to unavailability of energy from graphite - a major component of the Arumasu star) and quickly defeats him. 

After learning the secret out, the group returns to the ship heading to disable launchers, but they were too late because Ikarosu had already triggered it. Luckily, they stops the star explosions after Burger Director rewinds the time Pokkoru planet has not sucked the energy to restore the life on their planet. They save Pokkoru planet from destruction and the residents gradually apologizes to Aron for not trusting him. Later, the group bids Aron farewell and return to earth.

Production team
 Original - Fujiko F. Fujio
 Screenplay - Higashi Shimzu
 Director - Yoshihiro Osugi 
 Production - "Doraemon: Nobita's Space Heroes" 2015 Producer (Fujiko professional, Shin-Ei Animation, Shogakukan, Asatsu DK, TV Asahi, ShoPro, Toho, Dentsu, Shirogumi, Robot Communications, Asahi Broadcasting Corporation, menu - tele, Shuji Abe, Kyushu Asahi Broadcasting, Hokkaido TV, Hiroshima Home TV)
 Major Production - Shin-Ei Animation
 Distributed by - Toho

Cast

Music

For the first time on December 10, 2014 Miwa singer has revealed she will be able to present songs in the film. On February 25, 2015 her 17th single entitled "360" - the movie theme song was released.

The opening song: Yume wo Kanaete Doraemon (Character ver.) Author: Kurosu Katsuhiko / song - Doraemon (Wasabi Mizuta), Nobita (Ohara Megumi), Shizuka (Yumi Kakazu), Jaian (Kimura Subaru), Suneo (Tomokazu Seki) (Columbia )

The song ends: 360 Lyrics: Miwa / songwriter - Miwa & NAOKI-T / song - Miwa (Sony Music Japan Inc.)

Cage in the movie:

 Yume o Kanaete Doraemon / Lyrics: Kurosu Katsuhiko / Artist: Suginami Children Chorus
 Ginga Boueitai Miracle / Lyrics: Mike Sugiyama / Artist: Suginami Children Chorus

Guest Characters
 Aron - He comes from 'Pokkuru' planet to Earth to get help as his planet is being invaded by space monsters
 Burger Director - He is a gadget from Doraemon made to help the person using the gadget shoot a film.

Box office
The film topped the Japanese box office during its opening weekend (March 7–8) earning US$5.3 million on 557,000 admissions from 365 screens. As of April 19, 2015, it had grossed (¥3.75 billion) at the Japanese box office. As of February 2016, the film has grossed in Japan ($32.7 million), Hong Kong ($799,043), Italy ($1,295,875), South Korea ($696,169), Taiwan ($108,560), United Arab Emirates ($69,349), Vietnam ($350,706).

Here is the box office of this film of all the weekends in Japan:

Interesting Trivia 
The Arumasu planet, referred to as a sun made out of diamonds, is a planet that exists in the Milky Way, called 55 Cancri e.

References

External links
 

 ドラえもん映画祭2015
 DORAEMON BLUE PROJECT
 映画ドラえもん × タワーレコード キャンペーン
 のび太の宇宙英雄記（スペースヒーローズ）フェア
 ドラえもん&藤子・Ｆ・不二雄公式ファンブック Fライフ 

2015 films
2015 anime films
Nobita's Space Heroes
Japanese animated science fiction films
Animated films about cats
Animated films about robots
Films set on fictional planets
Robot films
2010s Japanese superhero films